Dae Mu-ye, also known as King Mu (r. 719–737), was the second king of the Balhae. He is noted for the military expansion of his domain.

Background 
Dae Mu-ye was the eldest son of Dae Jo-yeong, the founder of the ancient kingdom of Balhae, He ascended to the throne after the death in 719 of his father. He was given the title of "King of the Gyeru Province" by Tang Emperor Xuanzong. He gave the posthumous title King Go to his father, Dae Jo-yeong. Since then, He declared the era name In-an, an act of independence from China's Tang dynasty. On the other hand, he frequently sent embassies to the Tang, including his sons and brothers.

Reign 
Balhae's aggressive expansion triggered frictions with Tang China, Silla of southern Korea, the Khitans, the Xi, the Göktürks, and several Mohe tribes. When the Heishui Mohe in the north of Balhae came under the direct control of the Tang in 727, he attacked the Heishui Mohe fearing a pincer attack.

732, King Mu ordered a punitive expedition against Tang in present-day Shandong, sending the Balhae navy at the command of Jang Mun-hyu. In the same year, he led troops to Madushan (馬都山) in the vicinity of Shanhaiguan and occupied nearby towns.  In 733, Chinese Emperor Xuanzong ordered Dae Mun-ye to attack Balhae, along with forces from Silla, but the attack was unsuccessful and they were repelled.

In 727, Balhae began to dispatch embassies to Japan to avoid international isolation. The king sent an official document to Japan indicating that Balhae recovered the terrain of Goguryeo and succeeded to the culture of Buyeo. Japan, whose relationship with Silla was strained, welcomed them as a revival of Goguryeo.

In 732, He made an assault on Tang empire's Dengzhou. During the assault, the local governor of Dengzhou Wei Jun was killed. The assault was mostly an act of piracy and did not elevate to an international conflict until Wei's death. Later, Tang, allied with Silla, invaded Balhae but the advance of the allied troops was deterred by heavy snow. 

Dae Muye was succeeded by his son Dae Heummu in 737.

See also
List of Korean monarchs
History of Korea

References

External links
Encyclopædia Britannica
Britannica Concise Encyclopedia
 
Columbia Encyclopedia
U.S. Library of Congress: Country Studies
Provinces of Balhae Kingdom
  The extension of Balhae Kingdom under King Mu

737 deaths
Balhae rulers
Mohe peoples
8th-century rulers in Asia
Year of birth unknown